Cozi Noelle Zuehlsdorff (born August 3, 1998) is an American actress and singer best known for her role as Hazel Haskett in the movie Dolphin Tale (2011) and the sequel, Dolphin Tale 2 (2014).  She also appears in Mighty Med as Jordan, and in Liv and Maddie as Ocean. In November 2014, she released her debut EP, Originals. Cozi collaborated with Monstercat house artist Hellberg with his single "The Girl", on which Zuehlsdorff contributed vocals to, which was featured on his EP, "This Is Me" and on "Monstercat 021 – Perspective".

Career
Zuehlsdorff began acting in musicals at a young age. Her first major role was Hazel in the 2011 film Dolphin Tale. She then appeared in Disney Channel's Liv and Maddie and in Disney XD's Mighty Med prior to reprising her role of Hazel in Dolphin Tale 2. She starred in the  2018 TV film Freaky Friday.

Zuehlsdorff is also a singer-songwriter. She wrote and performed the song "Brave Souls" for Dolphin Tale 2. She released her debut independent EP Originals in November 2014. Zuehlsdorff has also been a featuring artist on Hellberg's song "The Girl", released March 16, 2015 and several more on Monstercat.

Discography

Extended plays 

 Originals (2014)

Singles 
2014: "Brave Souls"
2015: "Handpainted" (Brennley's Song)
2021: "The Old Me & You" (feat. Andrew Barth Feldman)

As featured artist 
Hellberg – The Girl (2015)
Rich Edwards – Where I'll Be Waiting (2016)
Vicetone – Nevada (2016)
Myrne – Confessions (2017)
Vicetone – Way Back (2018)
Aiobahn – Medusa (2019)
Damian McGinty – City of Angels (2021)

Filmography

References

External links 
 

1998 births
21st-century American actresses
American child actresses
American film actresses
American television actresses
Living people
Singers from California
Actresses from California
Monstercat artists
21st-century American singers
21st-century American women singers